Aeolanthes brochias is a moth of the family Depressariidae. It is found in China (Yunnan) and Taiwan.

References

Moths described in 1938
Aeolanthinae